Wiluna may refer to:
 Wiluna, Western Australia
 Wiluna Airport, the airport at Wiluna, Western Australia.
 Wiluna Branch Railway, a former branch line of the Western Australian Government Railways.
 Shire of Wiluna, a local government area in the Mid West region of Western Australia.
 Wiluna Gold Mine, a gold mine in Western Australia.